Yatsenko or Jacenko is a gender-neutral Ukrainian surname that may refer to:
Andriy Yatsenko (born 1997), Ukrainian freestyle wrestler
Leonid Yatsenko (born 1954), Ukrainian physicist
Lyn Jacenko (born 1953), Australian long jumper
Oleksandr Yatsenko (born 1985), Ukrainian footballer
Olena Yatsenko (born 1977), Ukrainian handball player
Roxy Jacenko (born 1980), Australian businesswoman, socialite and author

See also
 
 
Yatsenko I-28, a 1930s Soviet single-seat fighter plane

Ukrainian-language surnames